
Gmina Papowo Biskupie is a rural gmina (administrative district) in Chełmno County, Kuyavian-Pomeranian Voivodeship, in north-central Poland.

Villages
Gmina Papowo Biskupie contains the villages and settlements of Dubielno, Falęcin, Firlus, Folgowo, Jeleniec, Kucborek, Niemczyk, Nowy Dwór Królewski, Papowo Biskupie, Staw, Storlus, Wrocławki, Zegartowice and Żygląd.

Neighbouring gminas
Gmina Papowo Biskupie is bordered by the gminas of Chełmża, Kijewo Królewskie, Lisewo and Stolno.

References
Polish official population figures 2006

Papowo Biskupie
Chełmno County